The European Parliament election of 1979 took place on 10 June 1979.

Christian Democracy was by far the largest party in Veneto with 49.1%, while the Italian Communist Party came distant second with 20.3%

Results

Source: Regional Council of Veneto

Elections in Veneto
1979 elections in Italy
European Parliament elections in Italy
1979 European Parliament election